Alvimare is a commune  in the Seine-Maritime department in the Normandy region in northern France.

Geography

Population

Places of interest
 The wooden chapel dating from the sixteenth century.
 A sixteenth-century manorhouse
 The church of Notre-Dame, dating from the nineteenth century
 A fifteenth-century stone cross.

See also
Communes of the Seine-Maritime department

References

Communes of Seine-Maritime